Datong District is a district of the city of Daqing, Heilongjiang, People's Republic of China.

Administrative divisions
There are six subdistricts, four towns, and four townships in the district: 

Subdistricts:
Qingpu Subdistrict, Linyuanzhen Subdistrict, Lizhi Subdistrict, Xinhua Subdistrict, Datongzhen Subdistrict, Gaotaizizhen Subdistrict

Towns:
Datong, Gaotaizi, Taiyangsheng, Linyuan

Townships:
Bajingzi Township, Zhusan Township, Laoshantou Township, Shuangyushu Township

Notes and references 

Datong
Daqing